Balarama Krishnulu  is a 1992 Telugu-language drama film, produced by Sunkara Madhu Murali under the Vineela Art Productions banner, presented by Sri Sravanthi Movies and directed by Ravi Raja Pinisetty. The film stars Shobhan Babu, Rajashekhar, Jagapathi Babu, Ramya Krishna  and music was composed by Raj–Koti. The film is a remake of the Tamil movie Cheran Pandiyan from 1991.

Plot
The film begins in a village where a family feud upholds between the sibling Balaramaiah & Krishna Murthy the arbitrators and forefronts. Balaramaiah is a cohere to grounds of caste. Thus, he ostracizes his half-brother Krishna Murthy and sister Seeta getting hold of the exploitation of his sly distant relative Chintamani. Since their mother belongs to the lower tier. They share the same compound of their ancestors' property where Balaramaiah resides with his benevolent wife Vasumati & daughter Pooja. Vasumati is propitious towards Krishna Murthy’s family and also showers her affection for them. 

Meanwhile, Shivaji the cousin of Krishna Murthy lands in the village that he shelters. Time being, Shivaji falls for Pooja. Once, Antharvedi the debauchery son of Chitamani tries to molest Pooja and she is secured by Krishna Murthy. Chintamani utilizes it for polarization and raises the issue to the panchayat. Thereat, Krishna Murthy stays silent to protect his brother’s honor and receives a penalty. Simalteauneusly, he faces the music when Balaramaiah spoils the match of Seeta claiming them as illicit progeny. Above all, he blackballs him in their father’s ceremony. However, Krishna Murthy threshold the pain with patience. 

Concurrently, a liquor contractor Nukkuraju approaches the village to set up his business which is hindered by both the brothers and he is inflamed. At the same time, Chintamani puts forward a wedding proposal of Pooja & Antharvedi when Balaramaiah kicks him out. So, as envied he mingles with Nukka Raju and has been waiting for a shot. In the interim, Balaramaiah & Krishna Murthy discovers the love affair of Shivaji & Pooja. At this juncture, enraged Balaramaiah seeks to kill Pooja but Vasumathi pauses him. Parallelly, Krishna Murthy vows to unite the two birds and wipe off anyone who stands in the way. Now Balaramaiah casts around the matches for Pooja which are spoiled by Chintamani. Hence, he decides to knit his daughter with Anthatvedi. Therefrom, crafty makes Balaramaiah a puppet and forces him to approve Nukkaraju’s business. Further, he tries to grab their honorable family heritage temple authority anyhow Krishna Murthy bars it. 

During that dilemma, Shivaji & Pooja attempt to flee. Spotting it, Balaramaiah affirms his daughter has been dead. Accordingly, Krishna Murthy chooses to do the nuptial of the twosome. At that point, enraged Nukkaraju & Chintamani abducts when Seeta is seriously injured. Knowing it, Krishna Murthy and Shivaji move to her rescue. Despite this, Balaramaiah stays tough when Vasumathi uprisings on him, and breaks out several truths of which he is unbeknownst. Being cognizant of it, Balaramaiah realizes his mistake, embraces his sister, and also protects his brothers from the blaggards. Finally, the movie ends on a happy note with the reunion of the family.

Cast
Sobhan Babu as Balaramaiah
Dr. Rajashekhar as Krishna Murthy
Jagapati Babu as Shivaji
Ramya Krishna as Laliltha
Gollapudi Maruthi Rao as Chintamani
Rami Reddy as Nukaraju
Tanikella Bharani as Antharvedi
Brahmanandam
Babu Mohan
Maharshi Raghava as Raghava
Srividya as Vasumathi
Rajeevi as Pooja
Kalpana as Seeta
Disco Shanti as Dappula Kasthuri

Soundtrack

Music composed by Raj–Koti. Music released on SURYA Audio Company.

References

External links
 

1992 films
1990s Telugu-language films
Indian drama films
Films scored by Raj–Koti
Telugu remakes of Tamil films
Films directed by Ravi Raja Pinisetty